United States gubernatorial elections were held on November 5, 1985, in two states and one territory.  Both seats remained in their respective parties' controls, as Democrat Gerald Baliles held the open seat in Virginia, while Republican incumbent Tom Kean Sr. was reelected in New Jersey.

Election results

 
November 1985 events in the United States